Workers and Peasants Party may refer to:

Workers and Peasants Party (Egypt)
Workers and Peasants Party (France)
Workers and Peasants Party (India)
Workers' and Peasants' Party (Japan)
Workers' and Peasants' Party (Liechtenstein)
Workers' and Peasants' Party (Philippines)